Philippe G. Ciarlet (born 14 October 1938) is a French mathematician, known particularly for his work on mathematical analysis of the finite element method. He has contributed also to elasticity, to the theory of plates and shells and differential geometry.

Biography 
Philippe Ciarlet is a former student of the École Polytechnique and the École des ponts et chaussées. He completed his PhD at Case Institute of Technology in Cleveland in 1966 under the supervision of Richard S. Varga. He also holds a doctorate in mathematical sciences from the Faculty of Sciences of Paris (doctorate under the supervision of Jacques-Louis Lions in 1971).

He headed the mathematics department of the Laboratoire central des Ponts et Chaussées (1966-1973) and was a lecturer at the École polytechnique (1967-1985), professor at the École nationale des Ponts et Chaussées (1978-1987), consultant at INRIA (1974-1994). From 1974 to 2002, he was a professor at the University of Pierre et Marie Curie where he directed the laboratory of Numerical Analysis from 1981 to 1992.

He is Professor Emeritus at the University of Hong Kong, Professor at the City University of Hong Kong, Member of the Academy of Technology in 1989, Member of the French Academy of Sciences since 1991 (in the Mechanical and Computer Sciences section), Member of the Indian Academy of Sciences in 2001, Member of the European Academy of Sciences in 2003, Member of the World Academy of Sciences in 2007, Member of the Chinese Academy of Sciences in 2009, Member of the American Mathematical Society since 2012, and Member of the Hong-Kong Academy of Sciences in 2015.

Scientific work 
Numerical analysis of finite difference methods and general variational approximation methods: In his doctoral theses and early publications, Philippe Ciarlet made innovative contributions to the numerical approximation by variational methods of problems with non-linear monotonous boundaries, and introduced the concepts of discrete Green functions and the discrete maximum principle, which have since proved to be fundamental in numerical analysis.

Interpolation theory: Philippe Ciarlet has made innovative contributions, now "classical" to Lagrange and Hermite interpolation theory in R^n, notably through the introduction of the notion of multipoint Taylor formulas. This theory plays a fundamental role in establishing the convergence of finite element methods.

Numerical analysis of the finite element method: Philippe Ciarlet is well known for having made fundamental contributions in this field, including convergence analysis, the discrete maximum principle, uniform convergence, analysis of curved finite elements, numerical integration, non-conforming macroelements for plate problems, a mixed method for the biharmonic equation in fluid mechanics, and finite element methods for shell problems. His contributions and those of his collaborators can be found in his well-known book.

Plate modeling by asymptotic analysis and singular disturbance techniques: Philippe Ciarlet is also well known for his leading role in justifying two-dimensional models of linear and non-linear elastic plates from three-dimensional elasticity; in particular, he established convergence in the linear case, and justified two-dimensional non-linear models, including the von Kármán and Marguerre-von Karman equations, by the asymptotic development method.

Modeling, mathematical analysis and numerical simulation of "elastic multi-structures" including junctions: This is another entirely new field that Philippe Ciarlet has created and developed, by establishing the convergence of the three-dimensional solution towards that of a "multidimensional" model in the linear case, by justifying the limit conditions for embedding a plate.

Modeling and mathematical analysis of "general" shells: Philippe Ciarlet established the first existence theorems for two-dimensional linear shell models, such as those of W.T. Koiter and P.M. Naghdi, and justified the equations of the "bending" and "membrane" shell; he also established the first rigorous justification of the "shallow" two-dimensional linear shell equations and of Koiter equations, using asymptotic analysis techniques; he also obtained a new theory of existence for non-linear shell equations.

Non-linear elasticity: Philippe Ciarlet proposed a new energy function that is polyconvex (as defined by John Ball), and has proven to be very effective because it is "adjustable" to any given isotropic elastic material; he has also made important and innovative contributions to the modelling of contact and non-interpenetration in three-dimensional non-linear elasticity. He also proposed and justified a new non-linear Koiter-type model for non-linearly elastic hulls.

Non-linear inequalities of Korn on a surface: Philippe Ciarlet gave several new proofs of the fundamental theorem of surface theory, concerning the reconstruction of a surface according to its first and second fundamental forms. He was the first to show that a surface continuously varies according to its two fundamental forms, for different topologies, notably by introducing a new idea, that of non-linear Korn inequalities on a surface, another notion that he essentially created and developed with his collaborators.

Functional analysis: Philippe Ciarlet established weak forms of Poincaré's lemma and conditions of compatibility of Saint Venant, in Sobolev's spaces with negative exponents; he established that there are deep relationships between Jacques-Louis Lions' lemma, Nečas's inequality, Rham's theorem, and Bogovskii's theorem, which provide new methods to establish these results.

Intrinsic methods in linearized elasticity: Philippe Ciarlet has developed a new field, that of the mathematical justification of "intrinsic" methods in linearized elasticity, where the linearized metric tensor and the linearized tensor of curvature change are the new, and only, unknowns: This approach, whether for three-dimensional elasticity or for plate and shell theories, requires an entirely new approach, based mainly on the compatibility conditions of Saint-Venant and Donati in Sobolev spaces.

Intrinsic methods in non-linear elasticity: Philippe Ciarlet has developed a new field, that of the mathematical justification of "intrinsic" methods in non-linear elasticity. This approach makes it possible to obtain new existence theorems in three-dimensional non-linear elasticity.

Teaching and research books: Philippe Ciarlet has written several textbooks that are now "classics ", as well as several "reference" research books.

Honours and awards 
National Order of the Legion of Honour of France:

 Chevalier: 7 April 1999
 Officier: 5 June 2012

Member or Foreign Member of the following Academies :

   Academia Europaea, 1989
 Academy of Sciences, 1991
   Romanian Academy, 1996
   Academy of Technologies, 2004
   National Academy of Sciences of India, 2001
   European Academy of Sciences, 2003
   World Academy of Sciences (TWAS), 2007
   Chinese Academy of Sciences, 2009
   Hong Kong Academy of Sciences, 2015

Prizes

   Poncelet Prize, Academy of Sciences, 1981
   Grand Prize (Jaffé Prize), Academy of Sciences, 1989
   Alexander von Humboldt Research Fellowship, 1996
   Gold Medal, University of Santiago de Compostela, 1997
   Shanghai Prize for International Cooperation in Science and Technology, 2006

Academic awards

   Fellow of the Industrial and Applied Mathematics Society (SIAM), 2009
   Fellow of the Hong Kong Institute of Science, 2011
   Fellow of the American Mathematical Society (AMS), 2013
   Senior Fellow of the Institute of Advanced Study at the City University of Hong Kong, 2015
   "Honorary Professor", Fudan University, Shanghai, 1994
   "Senior Member", Institut Universitaire de France, 1996-2002
   "Honorary Professor", Transilvania University, Braşov, 1998
   Doctor honoris causa of the University of Ovidius, Constant¸a, 1999.
   Professor Emeritus, Pierre and Marie Curie University, 2002
   Doctor honoris causa, University of Bucharest, 2005
   "Honorary Professor", Xi'an Jiaotong University, 2006
   Doctor honoris causa, University of Craiova, 2007
Doctor honoris causa, Politehnica University of Bucharest, 2007
Doctor Honoris Causa, university "Alexandru loan Cuza" from laşi, 2012
Honorary Professor, South China University of Technology, 2019
Honorary Professor, Chongqing University, 2019.

References

External links
 home page  at City University of Hong Kong

École Polytechnique alumni
Numerical analysts
Members of the French Academy of Sciences
Foreign members of the Chinese Academy of Sciences
Recipients of the Legion of Honour
Case Western Reserve University alumni
Fellows of the Society for Industrial and Applied Mathematics
Fellows of the American Mathematical Society
Living people
1938 births